David Mudge (born October 22, 1974) is a former professional Canadian football offensive lineman who played in the Canadian Football League from 1997 to 1999 for the Toronto Argonauts, from 2000 to 2005 with the Winnipeg Blue Bombers and from 2005 to 2008 with the Montreal Alouettes. He won the CFL's Most Outstanding Offensive Lineman Award in 2001 while playing for the Blue Bombers. On February 16, 2009, he became a free agent. Since retiring from football, Mudge has worked Alouettes games for CJAD radio broadcasts of Montreal games. He joined the Alouettes Alumni Committee in late 2012.

After his professional football career, David Mudge joined CIBC Wood Gundy in 2015, five years after becoming an Investment Advisor and completing an MBA (Finance) from McGill University. In 2018, the Canadian Focused Equity portfolio was launched, which he now leads as Portfolio Manager.

References

1974 births
Living people
American football offensive linemen
Canadian football offensive linemen
Canadian players of American football
Michigan State Spartans football players
Montreal Alouettes players
Sportspeople from Whitby, Ontario
Toronto Argonauts players
Winnipeg Blue Bombers players